Mohammadabad (also Romanized as Moḩammadābād; also known as ‘Abd) is a village in Surak Rural District, Lirdaf District, Jask County, Hormozgan Province, Iran. At the 2006 census, its population was 158, in 37 families.

References 

Populated places in Jask County